Sara Kestelman (born 12 May 1944) is an English actress. She is known for her role as Lady Frances Brandon, Lady Jane Grey's mother, in the 1986 film Lady Jane, as well as for providing the voice of Kreia in Star Wars Knights of the Old Republic II: The Sith Lords.

Life and career
Kestelman was born in London, the daughter of Dorothy Mary (née Creagh), a dress designer, and Morris Kestelman, an artist. Her father was Jewish, from a family from Russia. 

In 1994, she won a Laurence Olivier Theatre Award for her performance as Fraulein Schneider in Cabaret in the London revival of the show. She has performed with the Royal National Theatre and the Royal Shakespeare Company. Kestelman joined the latter in 1968 but left in 1973 when she had her first film role in Zardoz. In 1982, she played Lady Macbeth.

Kestelman wrote a book of poetry, A Two Hander, with Susan Penhaligon. It was published by The Do-Not Press in 1996.

She voiced the character Kreia in the video game Star Wars: Knights of the Old Republic II: The Sith Lords.

Filmography

Film

TV

Documentaries
Reputations – Wiesenthal and Lord Kitchener
Horizon – Beyond a Joke

Theatre
The Importance of Being Earnest ~ (Library Theatre, Manchester, England)
The Crucible ~ (Library Theatre, Manchester, England)
The Physicists ~ (Library Theatre, Manchester, England)
A Midsummer Night's Dream ~ 1970 – Titania (Royal Shakespeare Theatre)
Enemies ~ 1971 – (Aldwych Theatre, London, England)
Macbeth ~ 1972 – Lady Macbeth (Birmingham Rep. England)
Marquise of Keith ~ 1974 – Mona/Anna (Aldwych Theatre, London, England)
Bedroom Farce ~ 1977 – (National Theatre, Lyttelton Theatre, London, England)
State of Revolution ~ 1977 – Kollontai (Repertory Theatre, Birmingham/The Lyttelton Theatre, London, England)
Twelve Repertoire Leaflets ~ 1978 – (National Theatre, London, England)
The Double Dealer ~ 1978/9 – (Olivier Theatre, London, England)
As You Like It ~ 1979 – Rosalind (National Theatre, London, England)
Undiscovered Country ~ 1979 – (Olivier Theatre, London, England)
The Fruits of Enlightenment ~ 1979 – Lady with the Monocle (Royal National Theatre, London, England)
Eleven Repertoire Leaflets ~ 1979 – 
Nine Repertoire Leaflets ~ 1980 – (National Theatre, London, England)
Childe Byron ~ 1981 – (Young Vic, London, England)
Macbeth ~ 1982 – (Royal Shakespeare Company, England)
Love for Love ~ 1985 – (Lyttelton Theatre, London, England)
Repertoire Leaflet ~ 1985/6 – (National Theatre, London, England)
The Threepenny Opera ~ 1986 – (Olivier Theater, London, England)
Four Repertoire Leaflets ~ 1986 – (Royal National Theatre, London, England)
The American Clock ~ 1986 – (Royal National Theatre, London, England)
Dalliance ~ 1986 – (Lyttelton Theatre, London, England)
Lettice and Lovage ~ 1988 – (West End, London, England)
Point Valaine ~ 1991 – Linda Valaine (Minerva Studio, Chichester, UK) (see Actor Connections – Theatre)
Cabaret ~ 1993 – Fraulein Schneider (Donmar Warehouse, London, England)
Fiddler on the Roof ~ 1994 – (London Palladium,London, England)
Three Tall Women ~ 1995 – (Wyndham's Theatre, London, England)
Nine ~ 1996 – (Donmar Warehouse, London, England)
Copenhagen ~ 1998 – Margrethe Bohr (The Duchess Theatre, ; West End, London, England)
Maria Marten or Murder in the Red Barn and Victorian Music Hall ~ 1999 – Dame Marten (Britten Theatre, London, England)
All About Me ~ 2001 – one woman show (Royal National Theatre, the Firebird Cafe in New York, the Royal Academy of Art)
Hamlet ~ 2001 – Queen Gertrude (Wilbur Theatre, Boston, MA, US)
Bitter Fruits of Palestine ~ 2002 – (Barons Court Theatre, London, England)
The Shape of Metal ~ 2003 – Nell Jeffrey (Abbey Theatre, Dublin, Ireland)
Girl with a Pearl Earring ~ 2008 (Cambridge Arts Theatre; West End, London, England)
Torch Song Trilogy ~ 2012 – Mrs Backoff (Menier Chocolate Factory, London)
The Intelligent Homosexual's Guide to Capitalism and Socialism with a Key to the Scriptures – 2016 – Clio – (Hampstead Theatre)
The Lady in the Van - 2017 - Margaret Fairchild/Miss Shepherd - (Theatre Royal, Bath)

Audio books
King Lear ~ 2002 – Regan
Mill on the Floss
Proto Zoe
Quarantine
The Siege
When I Lived in Modern Times
Full House

Radio
Full House (read and adapted)
Baldi

Video games
Star Wars: Knights of the Old Republic II: The Sith Lords ~ 2004 – voice of Kreia
Shattered Union ~ 2005 – Narrator (voice)

Awards, honours and nominations
Australian Film Institute
Nom 1977 Best Actress in a Lead Role for Break of Day
Clarence Derwent Award
Rec'd 1994 Best Supporting Performance in a Musical for Cabaret
Irish Times ESB Awards
Nom 2004 for The Shape of Metal
Laurence Olivier Theatre Award
Rec'd 1994 Best Supporting Performance in a Musical for Cabaret

References

External links

Ex Memoria

1944 births
Living people
Academics of the Royal Central School of Speech and Drama
Actresses from London
English film actresses
English stage actresses
English television actresses
English people of Russian-Jewish descent